The eighth season of the American sitcom Last Man Standing premiered on January 2, 2020, with two back-to-back episodes. Fox renewed the series for an eighth season in April 2019. The season contained twenty-one episodes and concluded on April 30, 2020.

The series continues to center around the work and home lives of Mike Baxter, his coworkers, and his family. It stars Tim Allen as Mike Baxter, alongside Nancy Travis, Amanda Fuller, Molly McCook, Christoph Sanders, Jordan Masterson, Jonathan Adams, Héctor Elizondo, and Krista Marie Yu. Former series regulars Kaitlyn Dever and Jet Jurgensmeyer both guest-starred during the season.

The season premiere, "No Parental Guidance", was watched by 5.21 million viewers, while the season finale, "How You Like Them Pancakes?", was watched by 4.25 million viewers.

Cast

Main
 Tim Allen as Mike Baxter
 Nancy Travis as Vanessa Baxter
 Amanda Fuller as Kristin Beth Baxter
 Molly McCook as Amanda Elaine "Mandy" Baxter-Anderson
 Christoph Sanders as Kyle Anderson
 Jordan Masterson as Ryan Vogelson
 Jonathan Adams as Chuck Larabee
 Héctor Elizondo as Edward "Ed" Alzate
 Krista Marie Yu as Jen

Recurring
 Jay Leno as Joe Leonard
 Susan Sullivan as Bonnie
 Tisha Campbell as Carol Larabee

Guest stars
 Kaitlyn Dever as Eve Baxter
 Terry Bradshaw as Terry
 Jet Jurgensmeyer as Boyd Baxter
 Bill Engvall as Reverend Paul
 Melissa Peterman as Celia "CeCe" Powers
 François Chau as Henry
 Lauren Tom as Fiona

Episodes

The number in the "No. overall" column refers to the episode's number within the overall series, whereas the number in the "No. in season" column refers to the episode's number within this particular season. "Production code" refers to the order in which the episodes were produced while "U.S. viewers (millions)" refers to the number of viewers in the U.S. in millions who watched the episode as it was aired.

Production

Development
On April 18, 2019, it was announced that Fox had renewed Last Man Standing for an eighth season. It was later revealed that the series would move from its longtime timeslot on Fridays to make room for WWE SmackDown. The series' was later revealed to be moving to Thursdays starting mid-season following the conclusion of Thursday Night Football. On October 24, 2019, it was announced that the season would premiere on January 2, 2020, with three weeks of back-to-back episodes, before switching to one episode per week starting on January 23. It was also revealed that the season would contain twenty-two episodes and would air at least one new episode each week until the end of the season. On March 15, 2020, it was announced that production had shut down on the season due to the COVID-19 pandemic leaving the planned season finale unfinished. Series regulars Tim Allen and Amanda Fuller each directed one episode of the season.

The season was originally scheduled to have 22 episodes, but one, titled "I Second That Emotion", was unproduced because of the closure of the Fox Studio lot due to the COVID-19 pandemic. It was later scrapped.

Casting
On November 12, 2019, it was revealed that Kaitlyn Dever, Susan Sullivan, Tisha Campbell, Bill Engvall, and Jay Leno would all reprise their roles from previous seasons as Eve, Bonnie, Carol, Reverend Paul, and Joe, respectively. On December 21, 2019, it was announced that Terry Bradshaw would guest-star in the season premiere as a fictionalized version of himself. The following day, it was revealed that Dever would be appearing in fewer episodes of the season than she had during the seventh season, due to her busy schedule. Former series regular Jet Jurgensmeyer also guest-starred during the season.

Viewing figures

References

2020 American television seasons
Last Man Standing (American TV series)
Television productions suspended due to the COVID-19 pandemic